The 2016 Merlion Cup has been the 10th edition of the Merlion Cup, an invitational club basketball tournament organized by the Basketball Association of Singapore. The 2016 edition marked the return of the tournament which was held two decades before in 1996.

The tournament took place at the OCBC Arena from 21–25 September and  featured six teams from six countries.

Participating teams
Six teams participated at the 2016 Merlion Cup.

Results

Group stage
Source: Basketball Association of Singapore

Group A

|}

Group B

|}

Final round

Semifinals

Fifth place game

Third place game

Final

Final standing

References

External links

2016-17
2016–17 in Asian basketball
2016–17 in Singaporean basketball
September 2016 sports events in Asia